Orthodoxy (1908) is a book by G. K. Chesterton which he described as a "spiritual autobiography". It has become a classic of Christian apologetics.

Chesterton considered this book a companion to his other work, Heretics, which was a collection of essays aimed at refuting prevalent secular views of his time and defending the Christian orthodoxy. Orthodoxy was written expressly in response to G. S. Street's criticism of Heretics. In it, Chesterton states that, "[Street] was not going to bother about his theology until I had really stated mine".  In the preface, Chesterton states the purpose is to "attempt an explanation, not of whether the Christian faith can be believed, but of how he personally has come to believe it." In Orthodoxy, Chesterton presents an original view of Christian religion. He sees it as the answer to natural human needs, the "answer to a riddle" in his own words, and not simply as an arbitrary truth received from somewhere outside the boundaries of human experience.

Summary 
The book chronicles Chesterton's personal journey to adopting a Christian worldview. Rather than rationalizing its paradoxes, Orthodoxy embraces them as evidence for the worldview's validity. The first chapter establishes the view that human needs innately conflict, and, along with Chapter 8, "The Romance of Orthodoxy", it explains Chesterton's belief that the Christian worldview is most effective in both explaining and satisfying those disparate needs.

History 
Chesterton began writing the book in response to Street's 1905 challenge titled "Mr. Chesterton.", and it was first published in 1908. The book was written when Chesterton was an Anglican. He converted to Catholicism 14 years later. Chesterton chose the title, Orthodoxy, to focus on the plainness of the Apostles' Creed, though he admitted the general sound of the title was "a thinnish sort of thing". Chesterton's choice to focus on the Apostles' Creed made Orthodoxy's apologetic appealing to Christians from many denominational backgrounds.

Popular Reception 
Orthodoxy was influential in the conversion of Theodore Maynard to Roman Catholicism as well as in the ordination of Canon Bernard Iddings Bell. In the magazine The Atlantic, critic James Parker recommends the book thusly: "If you've got an afternoon, read his masterpiece of Christian apologetics Orthodoxy: ontological basics retailed with a blissful, zooming frivolity, Thomas Aquinas meets Eddie Van Halen."

Notes

External links

 
 

Outline of Orthodoxy
Audio recording of Orthodoxy at Librivox

1908 non-fiction books
Books about Christianity
Books by G. K. Chesterton